Alison Snowden (born 4 April 1958) is an English animator, voice actress, producer, and screenwriter best known for Bob and Margaret alongside her Oscar-winning short Bob's Birthday which was also co-directed by her husband David Fine. Bob's Birthday serves as the pilot for the Alison Snowden and David Fine's animated TV show Bob and Margaret.

Life and work
Born in Arnold, Nottinghamshire, Snowden studied at the Mansfield Art College, Lanchester Polytechnic (now Coventry University) and subsequently the National Film and Television School where she collaborated with future husband David Fine. Alison Snowden's short Second Class Mail was nominated for the Academy Award for Best Animated Short Film at the 58th Academy Awards.

At the 67th Academy Awards, Snowden and Fine's short Bob's Birthday received the Oscar.

Snowden and Fine's NFB films Bob's Birthday and George and Rosemary are included in the Animation Show of Shows.

Alison Snowden, along with her husband David Fine, both created and produced Bob's Birthday and Bob and Margaret; the two have also written for the animated TV show Peppa Pig. They also developed Shaun the Sheep, another animated series, for Aardman Animations, and created the character of Timmy.

Family
Alison Snowden's daughter Lily is also a former voice actress with Astley Baker Davies, where she is best known for voicing Peppa Pig in the show of the same name, and has also appeared in Barbie: The Princess & the Popstar and the TV series Bob and Margaret. She currently works as an artist and illustrator.

Filmography
Most of the following were done with David Fine.

Screenwriter
1987: People and Science: A Test of Time
1989: In and Out
1993: Deadly Deposits
1993: Bob's Birthday
2007: Shaun the Sheep 
2007: Ricky Sprocket: Showbiz Boy
2018: Animal Behaviour

Director
1985: Second Class Mail
1987: People and Science: A Test of Time
1987: George and Rosemary 
1989: In and Out
1993: Bob's Birthday
2018: Animal Behaviour

Voice acting
1993: Bob's Birthday – Margaret Fish
1998: Bob and Margaret – Margaret Fish, Additional Voices
1998: Captain Star – Jelloide (one episode)
2004: Peppa Pig – Auntie Pig (Series 1-2) / Polly The Parrot
2007: Ricky Sprocket: Showbiz Boy – Additional voices
2018: Animal Behaviour - Linda

Producer
1985: Second Class Mail
1993: Bob's Birthday

Accolades
1986: Academy Award nomination for Second Class Mail
1988: Genie Award for Best Theatrical Short Film win for George and Rosemary
1995: Academy Award win for Bob's Birthday (with David Fine)
2019: Academy Award nomination for Animal Behaviour (with David Fine)

References

External links

1958 births
Living people
English animators
English screenwriters
English film directors
English film producers
British women film directors
British women film producers
British animated film directors
British animated film producers
English voice actresses
People from Arnold, Nottinghamshire
Directors of Best Animated Short Academy Award winners
Directors of Genie and Canadian Screen Award winners for Best Animated Short
British women animators
Alumni of Coventry University
Alumni of the National Film and Television School
National Film Board of Canada people